Drahany is a market town in Prostějov District in the Olomouc Region of the Czech Republic. It has about 500 inhabitants.

Notable people
Wilhelm Kosch (1879–1960), Austrian historian of literature

References

Populated places in Prostějov District
Market towns in the Czech Republic